The Alize 20 (English: Trade wind) is a French trailerable sailboat that was designed by E. G. van de Stadt as a day sailer and pocket cruiser, first built in 1963.

Production
The boat was the first sailboat design built by Jeanneau and marked their entry into that market. The Alize 20 was constructed in France, from 1963 until 1975, with 360 boats completed.

Design
The Alize 20 is a recreational keelboat, built predominantly of fiberglass, with wood trim. It has a fractional sloop rig. The hull has a raked stem, a plumb transom, a transom-hung rudder controlled by a tiller and a fixed stub keel with a retractable centerboard.

The design has sleeping accommodation for two people, with a double "V"-berth in the bow cabin.

For sailing downwind the design may be equipped with a symmetrical spinnaker.

See also
List of sailing boat types

Similar sailboats
Siren 17

References

Keelboats
Catamarans
1960s sailboat type designs
Sailing yachts
Trailer sailers
Sailboat type designs by E. G. van de Stadt
Sailboat types built by Jeanneau